Alice Lord (1877-1940)

was a Seattle union organizer. 

Lord was a critical figure in the advancement of Seattle's women-led unions in the early 1900s. She led the successful efforts to establish the eight-hour day and the $10 per week minimum wage for Washington women in 1913. 
She led the Waitresses Union for 40 of the 73 years of its existence.

Lord also helped organize other women workers in Seattle and nearby Washington cities, including domestic, garment, and candy and cracker makers as well as the Seattle Union Card and Label League.

References

1877 births
1940 deaths
Trade unionists from Washington (state)